Kinsey is a town in Houston County, Alabama, United States. It was initially located and incorporated in Henry County in February 1893. In 1903, it was redrawn into newly created Houston County and was later reincorporated in August 1957. It is part of the Dothan, Alabama Metropolitan Statistical Area. At the 2010 census the population was 2,198, up from 1,796 in 2000.

History
Kinsey was named for an early postmaster, Eliza Kinsey.

Geography
Kinsey is located in northern Houston County at  (31.291688, -85.345487). It is bordered to the south and west by the city of Dothan, to the southeast by the town of Webb, and to the north by the city of Headland in Henry County.

U.S. Route 431 passes through the western part of Kinsey, leading north  to Abbeville and southwest  to Dothan.

Demographics

2000 census
At the 2000 census there were 1,796 people in 687 households, including 509 families, in the town. The racial makeup of the town was 58.07% White, 40.48% Black or African American, 0.33% Asian, 0.06% Pacific Islander, 0.56% from other races, and 0.50% from two or more races. 1.22% of the population were Hispanic or Latino of any race.
Of the 687 households 42.6% had children under the age of 18 living with them, 50.8% were married couples living together, 19.4% had a female householder with no husband present, and 25.8% were non-families. 22.9% of households were one person and 7.4% were one person aged 65 or older. The average household size was 2.61 and the average family size was 3.07.

The age distribution was 32.2% under the age of 18, 8.6% from 18 to 24, 32.3% from 25 to 44, 18.0% from 45 to 64, and 8.8% 65 or older. The median age was 31 years. For every 100 females, there were 86.9 males. For every 100 females age 18 and over, there were 83.3 males.

The median household income was $27,578 and the median family income  was $33,950. Males had a median income of $25,669 versus $20,227 for females. The per capita income for the town was $14,196. About 20.3% of families and 21.3% of the population were below the poverty line, including 29.0% of those under age 18 and 17.8% of those age 65 or over.

2010 census
At the 2010 census there were 2,198 people in 810 households, including 598 families, in the town. The racial makeup of the town was 49.9% White, 46.0% Black or African American, 0.1% Asian, 0.0% Pacific Islander, 2.1% from other races, and 1.5% from two or more races. 4.0% of the population were Hispanic or Latino of any race.
Of the 810 households 37.5% had children under the age of 18 living with them, 46.8% were married couples living together, 21.7% had a female householder with no husband present, and 26.2% were non-families. 22.8% of households were one person and 6.0% were one person aged 65 or older. The average household size was 2.71 and the average family size was 3.18.

The age distribution was 30.2% under the age of 18, 9.1% from 18 to 24, 28.5% from 25 to 44, 22.6% from 45 to 64, and 9.7% 65 or older. The median age was 32.4 years. For every 100 females, there were 95.0 males. For every 100 females age 18 and over, there were 89.4 males.

The median household income was $33,516 and the median family income  was $34,643. Males had a median income of $29,429 versus $22,339 for females. The per capita income for the town was $17,145. About 20.3% of families and 23.3% of the population were below the poverty line, including 40.2% of those under age 18 and 10.7% of those age 65 or over.

2020 census

As of the 2020 United States census, there were 2,203 people, 796 households, and 519 families residing in the town.

References 

Towns in Houston County, Alabama
Towns in Alabama
Dothan metropolitan area, Alabama